Patricio Martín Matricardi (born 7 January 1994) is an Argentine professional footballer who plays as a centre-back for Romanian Liga I club FC Voluntari.

Career
Matricardi's career began with Argentinos Juniors, moving into the first-team proper for the 2013–14 Argentine Primera División season and subsequently making three appearances as the club were relegated to Primera B Nacional; he had previously made his senior debut in the Copa Argentina in 2013 versus Sportivo Belgrano. He went on to feature in thirty-two more matches for Argentinos Juniors over the next three campaigns, all in the Argentine Primera División after instant promotion back in 2014. On 10 January 2017, San Martín loaned Matricardi. His first appearance arrived on 11 March against Huracán.

He returned to his parent club in the following June, prior to again leaving on loan to join Primera B Nacional's Gimnasia y Esgrima. Matricardi scored twice in seventeen games, including his career first in November during an away draw with Los Andes. In July 2018, Super League Greece side Asteras Tripolis completed the signing of Matricardi. He'd remain for two seasons and make twenty appearances in all competitions. On 14 August 2020, Matricardi signed with Russian Premier League club Rotor Volgograd. He made his debut in a home loss to Rubin Kazan on 27 September. Two more games followed.

Matricardi terminated his contract with Rotor Volgograd on 19 January 2021. On 25 January, Matricardi headed to Romania with Hermannstadt of Liga I. His debut appearance came on 28 January, as he featured for the full duration of a 1–1 draw at home to Chindia Târgoviște.

Career statistics
.

References

External links

1994 births
Living people
People from Florencio Varela Partido
Argentine people of Italian descent
Argentine footballers
Association football defenders
Argentine expatriate footballers
Expatriate footballers in Greece
Expatriate footballers in Russia
Expatriate footballers in Romania
Argentine expatriate sportspeople in Greece
Argentine expatriate sportspeople in Russia
Argentine expatriate sportspeople in Romania
Argentine Primera División players
Primera Nacional players
Super League Greece players
Russian Premier League players
Liga I players
Argentinos Juniors footballers
San Martín de San Juan footballers
Gimnasia y Esgrima de Jujuy footballers
Asteras Tripolis F.C. players
FC Rotor Volgograd players
FC Hermannstadt players
CS Gaz Metan Mediaș players
FC Voluntari players
Sportspeople from Buenos Aires Province